The 2017 German Darts Grand Prix was the tenth of twelve PDC European Tour events on the 2017 PDC Pro Tour. The tournament took place at Maimarkthalle, Mannheim, Germany, between 8–10 September 2017. It featured a field of 48 players and £135,000 in prize money, with £25,000 going to the winner.

Michael van Gerwen won the tournament, defeating Rob Cross 6–3 in the final.

Prize money 
This is how the prize money is divided:

Qualification and format 
The top 16 entrants from the PDC ProTour Order of Merit on 30 June automatically qualified for the event and were seeded in the second round.

The remaining 32 places went to players from five qualifying events – 18 from the UK Qualifier (held in Barnsley on 4 August), eight from the West/South European Qualifier (held on 31 August), four from the Host Nation Qualifier (held on 31 August), one from the Nordic & Baltic Qualifier (held on 11 August) and one from the East European Qualifier (held on 26 August).

The following players took part in the tournament:

Top 16
  Michael van Gerwen (winner)
  Peter Wright (second round)
  Mensur Suljović (third round)
  Simon Whitlock (semi-finals)
  Michael Smith (quarter-finals)
  Daryl Gurney (third round)
  Alan Norris (second round)
  Kim Huybrechts (second round)
  Jelle Klaasen (quarter-finals)
  Benito van de Pas (semi-finals)
  Ian White (quarter-finals)
  Joe Cullen (third round)
  Dave Chisnall (second round)
  Rob Cross (runner-up)
  Mervyn King (second round)
  Gerwyn Price (third round)

UK Qualifier
  Robert Owen (first round)
  Andy Boulton (first round)
  Darren Webster (third round)
  Steve Beaton (first round)
  Jamie Bain (second round)
  Andrew Gilding (first round)
  Kyle Anderson (third round)
  Jamie Lewis (second round)
  Mickey Mansell (first round)
  Keegan Brown (second round)
  Paul Rowley (first round)
  Jamie Caven (second round)
  Mick Todd (first round)
  Nathan Aspinall (third round)
  James Richardson (first round)
  Richard North (second round)
  Mick McGowan (second round)
  Ryan Meikle (first round)

West/South European Qualifier
  Dirk van Duijvenbode (first round)
  Zoran Lerchbacher (first round)
  Vincent van der Voort (quarter-finals)
  Ronny Huybrechts (third round)
  Jermaine Wattimena (second round)
  Michael Plooy (first round)
  Jan Dekker (second round)
  Tony Martinez (second round)

Host Nation Qualifier
  Michael Hurtz (first round)
  Max Hopp (first round)
  Bernd Roith (first round)
  Martin Schindler (first round)

Nordic & Baltic Qualifier
  Daniel Larsson (second round)

East European Qualifier
  Krzysztof Ratajski (second round)

Draw

References 

2017 PDC European Tour
2017 in German sport